The  were an Asia League Ice Hockey team based in Kushiro City in Hokkaidō, Japan.

History
The club was founded as Jūjō Paper Kushiro Ice Hockey Club in 1949. They adopted the new name Nippon Paper Cranes in 1993 when Jūjō Paper and Sanyō Kokusaku Pulp merged to form Nippon Paper.

They won the inaugural Asia League Ice Hockey title in the 2003–04 season, and have won it four times overall. They also have won the All Japan Ice hockey Championship seven times. After the 2018–19 season, the team was dissolved due to financial difficulties, and was replaced by the East Hokkaido Cranes.

Honours
Asia League:
Winners (4): 2003–04,  2006–07, 2008–09, 2013–14
All Japan Championship:
Winners (7): 2006, 2007, 2010, 2011, 2012, 2013, 2015

Season-by-season record

Asia League 
*prior to the 2008–2009 season, there were no shoot-outs and games ended in a tie

Past import players

 Georgy Yevtyukhin, 1996–97 C
 Joel Dyck 2003–2009, D
 Chris Lindberg 2004–05, LW
 Derek Plante 2005–07, D
 Jamie McLennan 2007–08, G
 Tyson Nash 2007–08, LW
 Kelly Fairchild 2008–09, C
 Brad Tiley 2008–09, D
 Pierre-Olivier Beaulieu 2009–10, D
 Ash Goldie 2010–11, FW
 Mike Madill 2010–11, D
 Ray DiLauro 2011, D
 Tyler Mosienko 2011–12, C
 John Hecimovic 2011–12, RW

References

Nippon Paper Industries
Asia League Ice Hockey teams
Ice hockey clubs established in 1949
Sports teams in Hokkaido
Ice hockey teams in Japan
Ice hockey clubs disestablished in 2019
2019 disestablishments in Japan